Roger Simpson (born 27 August 1967) is an English former professional rugby league footballer. He started his career at Bradford Northern in 1985, making over 250 appearances for the club before joining Batley Bulldogs in 1996. He also received one cap for England in 1995.

Playing career

Bradford Northern
In August 1984, Simpson was signed by Bradford Northern from amateur club Moldgreen on his 17th birthday. He made his senior debut for the club against Featherstone Rovers in September 1985.

Simpson played  in Bradford Northern's 12–12 draw with Castleford in the 1987 Yorkshire Cup Final during the 1987–88 season at Headingley, Leeds on Saturday 17 October 1987, and played  in the 11–2 victory over Castleford in the replay at Elland Road, Leeds on Saturday 31 October 1987. 

He played  in the 15–8 defeat by Wigan in the 1992–93 Regal Trophy Final during the 1992–93 season at Elland Road, Leeds on Saturday 23 January 1993.

Simpson became the groundsman at Odsal Stadium while playing for Bradford, a job which he continued after ending his playing career.

Batley Bulldogs
Simpson was signed by Batley Bulldogs in 1996, and made his debut for the club against Whitehaven in March 1996.

He scored the 100th try of his career in the 1998 Trans-Pennine Cup final in a 28–12 win against Oldham.

International honours
Simpson was selected in the Great Britain squad for the 1990 Lions tour of Papua New Guinea and New Zealand. He played in five non-Test matches for the team during the tour.

Simpson won one cap for England in 1995 while at Bradford Northern, appearing as a substitute against France.

Personal life
Roger Simpson is the father of Jared Simpson, who played rugby league for Huddersfield Giants between 2015 and 2018.

References

External links
Photograph "1989/90 Team Photo -  1989/90 Team Photo - 26/08/1989" at rlhp.co.uk
Photograph "Bradford Northern 1993/4 -  The Bradford Northern squad for the 1993/4 season. - 01/01/1993" at rlhp.co.uk
Photograph "Return to Odsal -  Ex-players lead out the team on the return to Odsal after two seasons at Valley Parade - 09/03/2003" at rlhp.co.uk
Photograph "Trevor kisses the turf -  Trevor Foster kisses the turf on the return to Odsal after two seasons at Valley Parade - 09/03/2003" at rlhp.co.uk

1967 births
Living people
Rugby league wingers
English rugby league players
Bradford Bulls players
Batley Bulldogs players
England national rugby league team players
Place of birth missing (living people)